Tea Mäkipää (born 1973) is a Finnish artist known for her installations, architectural works and videos. She earned a BA in Fine Art, from the Academy of Fine Arts (Finland), Helsinki and an MA from the Royal College of Art in London. Her works are in the collections of  Helsinki Art Museum, Helsinki; the Collection Pentti Kouri; City of Helsinki, the State of Finland Central Archive of Art, Kiasma; Museum of Contemporary Art, Helsinki; Akademie Schloss Solitude, Stuttgart (Germany); Sammlung Federkiel, Leipzig (Germany).  Her works often deal with ecological disaster, depicting a world afterwards, such as raised sea levels or the end of oil.

Solo exhibitions
2007 Motocalypse Now, Kunstverein Langenhagen, Hannover, Germany
2006 Catwalk, Kunstlerhaus Bethanien, Berlin
2005 Sexgod, Galleri21, Malmö, Sweden
2004 ASolitude, Akademie Schloss Solitude, Stuttgart, Germany

References

External links

 artist website
 Tenstakonsthall
 exhibition
 exhibition Irish Museum of modern art

1973 births
Living people
21st-century Finnish women artists
Finnish installation artists
Women installation artists
Alumni of the Royal College of Art